Agnes of Rome is a virgin martyr, venerated as a saint in the Catholic Church, Oriental Orthodox Church and the Eastern Orthodox Church, as well as the Anglican Communion and Lutheran Churches. St. Agnes is one of several virgin martyrs commemorated by name in the Canon of the Mass.

She is, among other patronages, a patron saint of girls, chastity, virgins, victims of sex abuse, and gardeners. Saint Agnes' feast day is 21 January.

Biography
Substantially the broader social circumstances of her martyrdom are believed to be authentic, though the legend cannot be proven true, and many details of the fifth century Acts of Saint Agnes are open to criticism. A church was built over her tomb, and her relics venerated.

According to tradition, Agnes was a member of the Roman nobility, born in AD 291 and raised in an early Christian family. She suffered martyrdom at the age of twelve or thirteen during the reign of the Roman emperor Diocletian, on 21 January 304.

A beautiful young girl from a wealthy family, Agnes had many suitors of high rank, and the young men, slighted by her resolute devotion to religious purity, submitted her name to the pagan authorities as a follower of Christianity.

The Prefect Sempronius condemned Agnes to be dragged naked through the streets to a brothel. In one account, as she prayed, her hair grew and covered her body.  It was also said that all of the men that attempted to rape her were immediately struck blind. The son of the prefect was struck dead but revived after she prayed for him, causing her release. There commenced a trial from which Sempronius recused himself, allowing another figure to preside and sentence St. Agnes to death. She was led out and bound to a stake, but the bundle of wood would not burn, or the flames parted away from her, whereupon the officer in charge of the troops drew his sword and beheaded her, or, in some other texts, stabbed her in the throat. It is also said that her blood poured to the stadium floor where other Christians soaked it up with cloths.

Agnes was buried beside the Via Nomentana in Rome. A few days after her death, her foster-sister, Emerentiana, was found praying by her tomb; she claimed to be the daughter of Agnes' wet nurse, and was stoned to death after refusing to leave the place and reprimanding the people for killing her foster-sister. Emerentiana was also later canonized. The daughter of Constantine I, Constantina, was said to have been cured of leprosy after praying at Agnes' tomb.  She and Emerentiana appear in the scenes from the life of Agnes on the 14th-century Royal Gold Cup in the British Museum.

An early account of Agnes' death, stressing her young age, steadfastness and virginity, but not the legendary features of the tradition, is given by Ambrose.

Veneration

Agnes was venerated as a saint at least as early as the time of St Ambrose, based on an existing homily. She is commemorated in the Depositio Martyrum of Filocalus (354) and in the early Roman Sacramentaries.

Saint Agnes' bones are conserved beneath the high altar in the church of Sant'Agnese fuori le mura in Rome, built over the catacomb that housed her tomb. Her skull is preserved in a separate chapel in the church of Sant'Agnese in Agone in Rome's Piazza Navona.

Agnes is remembered in the Anglican Communion with a Lesser Festival on 21 January.

Patronage

Because of the legend around her martyrdom, Saint Agnes is patron saint of those seeking chastity and purity. She is also the patron saint of young girls and girl scouts. Folk custom called for them to practise rituals on Saint Agnes' Eve (20–21 January) with a view to discovering their future husbands. This superstition has been immortalised in John Keats's poem, The Eve of Saint Agnes.

Iconography
Since the Middle Ages, Saint Agnes has traditionally been depicted as a young girl with her long hair down, with a lamb, the symbol of both her virginal innocence and her name, and a sword (together with the palm branch an attribute of her martyrdom). The lamb, which is agnus in the Latin language, is also the linguistic link to the traditional blessing of lambs referred to below.

Blessing of the lambs 
On the feast of Saint Agnes two lambs are traditionally brought from the Trappist abbey of Tre Fontane in Rome in order to be blessed by the Pope. In summer the lambs are shorn, and the wool is used to weave the pallia which the Pope gives on the feast of Saint Peter and Paul to the newly appointed metropolitan archbishops as a sign of his jurisdiction and their union with the pope. This tradition of the blessing of the lambs has been known since the 16th century.

Notable churches

 Basilica of St James and St Agnes, Nysa, Poland
 St Agnes Cathedral, Rockville Centre, New York 
 St Agnes Church, New York City
 Sant'Agnese in Agone, Rome
 Sant'Agnese fuori le mura, Rome
 , Lac-Mégantic, Quebec, Canada
 St Agnes, St Agnes, Cornwall, England
 St Agnes, Cologne, Germany
 St Agnes, Cawston, Norfolk, England
 St Agnes' Church, St Agnes, Isles of Scilly, England
 St Agnes Cathedral, Springfield, Missouri, US
St Agnes Church, Saint Paul, Minnesota

Legacy
The Congregation of Sisters of St. Agnes is a Roman Catholic religious community for women based in Fond du Lac, Wisconsin, US. It was founded in 1858, by Father Caspar Rehrl, an Austrian missionary, who established the sisterhood of pioneer women under the patronage of Agnes, to whom he had a particular devotion. 

The city of Santa Ynez, California is named after her.

Cultural references
Hrotsvitha, the tenth-century nun and poet, wrote a heroic poem about Agnes.

In the historical novel Fabiola or, the Church of the Catacombs, written by Cardinal Nicholas Wiseman in 1854, Agnes is the soft-spoken teenage cousin and confidant of the protagonist, the beautiful noblewoman Fabiola.

The Eve of St. Agnes is a Romantic narrative poem written by John Keats in 1819.

The instrumental song "Saint Agnes and the Burning Train" appears on the 1991 album The Soul Cages by Sting.

The song "Bear’s Vision of St. Agnes" appears on the 2012 album Ten Stories by rock band mewithoutYou.

The St. Agnes Library is a branch of the New York Public Library located on the Upper West Side of Manhattan, on Amsterdam Avenue between West 81st and West 82nd Streets.

Gallery

See also
List of Catholic saints
Saint Agnes of Rome, patron saint archive

References

Further reading
Of Saint Agnes in "Ælfric's Lives of Saints", by Ælfric of Eynsham London, Pub. for the Early English text society, by N. Trübner & co. (1881).

External links

 "St Agnes – St Peter's Square Colonnade Saints"
 Satucket.com, St. Agnes of Rome
 "Saint Agnes" at the Christian Iconography website
 "Of Saint Agnes" from the Caxton translation of the Golden Legend
 Remarks on the feast of St. Agnes from St. Ambrose of Milan, On Virgins
 Saint Agnes – The patron saint of young girls.

Christian child saints
291 births
304 deaths
4th-century Christian martyrs
3rd-century Roman women
4th-century Roman women
3rd-century Christian saints
4th-century Christian saints
People executed by the Roman Empire
Virgin martyrs
Burials at Sant'Agnese fuori le mura
Ante-Nicene Christian female saints
Late Ancient Christian female saints
Anglican saints
Christians martyred during the reign of Diocletian
Christian martyrs